|}
Denis Wilfred Collins (born 27 October 1941) is a former Australian politician. He was a member of the Northern Territory Legislative Assembly from 1980 to 1997, representing Alice Springs until 1983, Sadadeen until 1990 and Greatorex thereafter. He was first elected as a member of the Country Liberal Party, but lost the preselection to future Chief Minister Shane Stone in 1986 and became an Independent, defeating Stone to win re-election in 1987. A conspiracy theorist, Collins advocated burying guns in the desert in response to the Fabian Socialist World Bank conspiracy. He was defeated in 1994 by CLP candidate Richard Lim.

In later years he joined One Nation, and contested the Tasmanian seat of Bass for the party in 2001.

References

1941 births
Living people
Members of the Northern Territory Legislative Assembly
Country Liberal Party members of the Northern Territory Legislative Assembly
Independent members of the Northern Territory Legislative Assembly
Australian conspiracy theorists